Ashleigh Ellwood Brilliant (born 9 December 1933) is an English-born American author and cartoonist. He is best known for his Pot-Shots, single-panel illustrations with one-line humorous remarks, which began syndication in the United States in 1975.

Life and career
Brilliant was born in London, England. He attended Hendon County School, London, in the 1940s–50s. He graduated from the University of California at Berkeley with a PhD in history in 1964 and taught on a "floating university", an educational cruise ship that traveled around the world in the mid-60s. He later taught at a community college in Bend, Oregon.

During the "Summer of Love" in San Francisco in 1967, Brilliant gave daily lectures near the Haight Street entrance of Golden Gate Park. He released a live album recorded in Golden Gate Park in 1967 on a small Hollywood, California, record label, Dorash Enterprises (Dorash LP-1001). The album, Ashleigh Brilliant in the Haight-Ashbury, is quite rare today. The material uses familiar public domain tunes and melodies and incorporates clever poetic lyrics about marijuana, the Diggers, San Francisco neighborhoods, and his personal experiences, all the while displaying a banter which ebbs and flows with his audience, who respond warmly to the performance and also participate in the songs. He states in the recording that he had been performing in this setting for approximately two hours each day the prior four weeks. He laughs throughout his performance, while the audience joins him in singing along and banging on percussive items. The album ends with a "Haight-Ashbury Farewell".

The Wall Street Journal described him in a 1992 profile as "history's only full time, professional published epigrammatist".

At one time, there was some confusion and controversy as to the ownership and recognition of his distinctive art form. In a copyright infringement suit filed by Brilliant, a United States federal judge ruled that while short phrases are not eligible for copyright, Brilliant's works were epigrams and therefore copyrightable (Brilliant v. W.B. Productions Inc., 1979).

While Brilliant employs a self-imposed limit of 17 words per epigram, he has actually written and published 41 with 18 words and one with 19 words.  Once discovered, all these errors were corrected and then re-published.

In 1999 he authored the "Y1K Crisis" article which parodies the "Y2K Crisis" of 1999.

Part of the counter-culture scene in San Francisco in the late 1960s, Brilliant wrote and sang a series of parody songs about the hippie movement in Golden Gate Park as the hippie movement happened.  Called The Haight-Ashbury Songbook, the songs now appear on a CD collection available on his website.

Brilliant celebrated his 80th birthday in December 2013 in Franceschi Park in his current home town of Santa Barbara, California. There he was presented with a document signed by the mayor proclaiming him to be the "Wise Old Man of the Mountain".

Criticism
In an essay entitled "Against intellectual property", Brian Martin cites Brilliant as a "professional epigrammatist" who has been known to threaten legal action in order to display his market precedence over legally owned fragments of human language, thus managing to reveal one of the many absurdities behind "intellectual property", namely its ability to limit the free use and dissemination of human expression.  When Brilliant finds someone who has "used" one of his epigrams, he contacts them demanding a payment for breach of copyright.

For instance, television journalist David Brinkley wrote a book, Everyone is Entitled to My Opinion, the title of which he attributed to a friend of his daughter.  Brilliant contacted Brinkley about copyright violation and Random House, Brinkley's publisher, paid Brilliant $1000 without contesting the issue.

In a separate 1979 case, a company copied two of Brilliant's phrases – "I may not be totally perfect, but parts of me are excellent" and "I have abandoned my search for truth and am now looking for a good fantasy"—and altered a third phrase, all for sale on T-shirt transfers. The district court acknowledged that the phrases were distinguished by conciseness, cleverness, and pointed observation, ruling that they were protected by copyright.

As Brilliant himself insists that his "phrases" (or "Pot-Shots") are original epigrams, then it follows that any use of them without his permission, specifically for commercial reasons (or for financial gain, or profit), would be a breach of copyright. One similar to the use of any other "poetic" material (specifically, large portions of said work) without the author's consent.

Books
All books published by Woodbridge Press (Santa Barbara, California)
 I May Not Be Totally Perfect, but Parts of Me Are Excellent, and Other Brilliant Thoughts (1979), 
 I Have Abandoned My Search for Truth, and Am Now Looking for a Good Fantasy: More Brilliant Thoughts (1980),  (paperback)
 Appreciate Me Now, and Avoid the Rush: Yet More Brilliant Thoughts (1981),  (paperback) at Internet Archive
 I Feel Much Better, Now That I've Given Up Hope: And Even More Brilliant Thoughts (1984),  (paperback)
 All I Want Is a Warm Bed and a Kind Word and Unlimited Power: Even More Brilliant Thoughts (1985),  (paperback)
 The Great Car Craze: How Southern California Collided with the Automobile in the 1920s (1989), .
 Be a Good Neighbor, and Leave Me Alone: And Other Wry and Riotous Writings (1992),  (paperback)
 I Try to Take One Day at a Time, but Sometimes Several Days Attack Me at Once: More Brilliant Thoughts Than Ever (1987),  (paperback)
 We've Been Through So Much Together, and Most of It Was Your Fault: More and More Brilliant Thoughts (1990), 
 I Want to Reach Your Mind... Where Is It Currently Located?: More Incredibly Brilliant Thoughts (1994),  (paperback)
 I'm Just Moving Clouds Today, Tomorrow I'll Try Mountains: And Other More or Less Blissfully Brilliant Thoughts (1998),

References

Sources

Strickler, Dave. Syndicated Comic Strips and Artists, 1924–1995: The Complete Index. Cambria, CA: Comics Access, 1995.  at Internet Archive

External links

 
Haight Ashbury Song Book Ashleigh Brilliant, 1967, photograph
Ashleigh Brilliant in Santa Barbara (interview), David Peacock (Dux Lux Productions), 2014 

American cartoonists
British cartoonists
Epigrammatists
Artists from London
Writers from California
1933 births
Living people